This is a list of analog television stations in the Philippines. Currently, there are two major networks competing for bigger audience share; GMA Network Inc. and TV5 Network, Inc. (ABS-CBN is also one of the largest analog broadcasters until they lost their frequency because their legislative franchise has expired and the congress has also denied their application for franchise renewal.) Most free-to-air networks are popularly known by their flagship channels (e.g.  IBC 13, TV5, RPN 9 and GMA 7 (Manila) instead of simply Intercontinental Broadcasting Corporation, TV5 Network, Radio Philippines Network and GMA Network respectively). Analog television in the Philippines began to shut down on February 28, 2017, and is scheduled to complete by 2023. Currently, all analog TV stations are still using the NTSC standard.

NTC's Frequency Allocations 

These frequencies are used in Philippine Analog Television broadcasting.

Metro Manila (NCR)

Metro Manila

Inactive stations

Inactive station that Uses higher than the NTC's Frequency Standards

The following TV Station is inactive and this station is still off-the-air until now, as this station is using higher than the NTC's Philippine Television Frequency for UHF, which is between 471.25 MHz and 693.25 MHz (Video Carrier).

The frequencies above 700 MHz (Channels 52 to 69 are assigned from 699.25 MHz to 801.25 MHz Video Carrier) was used for Wireless Broadband Providers and Public Communications.

For more details, refer to Pan-American television frequencies.

Cordillera Administrative Region (CAR)

Abra

Benguet

Mountain Province

Region I (Ilocos Region)

Ilocos Norte

Ilocos Sur

La Union

Pangasinan

Region II (Cagayan Valley)

Batanes

Cagayan

Isabela

Region III (Central Luzon)

Aurora

Nueva Ecija

Pampanga

*Signals can be seen in some parts of Metro Manila

Tarlac

Zambales

Region IV-A (Calabarzon)

Batangas

*Signals can be seen in some parts of Metro Manila

Quezon

Rizal

*Signals can be seen in some parts of Metro Manila

Region IV-B (Mimaropa)

Occidental Mindoro

Oriental Mindoro

Palawan

Romblon

Region V (Bicol Region)

Albay

Camarines Norte

Camarines Sur

Catanduanes

Masbate

Sorsogon

Region VI (Western Visayas)

Aklan

Capiz

Iloilo

Negros Occidental

Region VII (Central Visayas)

Bohol

Cebu

Negros Oriental

Region VIII (Eastern Visayas)

Eastern Samar

Leyte

Western Samar

Region IX (Zamboanga Peninsula)

Zamboanga del Norte

Zamboanga del Sur

Zamboanga Sibugay

Zamboanga City

Region X (Northern Mindanao)

Bukidnon

Lanao del Norte

Misamis Occidental

Misamis Oriental

Region XI (Davao Region)

Davao del Norte

Davao del Sur

Region XII (Soccsksargen)

South Cotabato

Region XIII (Caraga Region)

Agusan del Norte

Agusan del Sur

Surigao del Norte

Surigao del Sur

BARMM (Bangsamoro Autonomous Region in Muslim Mindanao)

Lanao del Sur

Maguindanao

Sulu

See also
Television in the Philippines
List of television stations in Southeast Asia
List of radio stations in the Philippines

References

Philippines
Television stations in the Philippines
Philippine television-related lists